SMNI Newsline Philippines (formerly known as Newsline Pilipinas) is the flagship weekday newscast of Sonshine Media Network International and SMNI News Channel. It aired from June 5, 2006 to December 30, 2016. The newscast airs every noontime Monday to Friday at 12:00 NN (PST).

Anchors

Final
 Jean B. Domingo
 Rafael Eniola
 Jason Fabular
 Dianne Hortaleza

Past
 Carlo Catiil
 Kathy Villanueva
 Rowel Villanueva
 Nancy Tan
 Jhomel Santos
 Vanessa Reyes
 Ruben Sumipo
 Reynald Tapel
 Gretchen Belleza
 Ryan Castillo
 Praya Tupan

See also
 Sonshine Media Network International

Sonshine Media Network International
Philippine television news shows
Television in Davao City
2006 Philippine television series debuts
2016 Philippine television series endings
2000s Philippine television series
2010s Philippine television series